LANY is the debut studio album by American band LANY. It was released on June 30, 2017, by Polydor Records and contains the single "ILYSB".

Reception

LANY received mixed reviews from critics. On Metacritic, the album holds a score of 66/100 based on 6 reviews, indicating "generally favorable reviews."

Track listing

Charts

References

2017 debut albums
LANY albums
Polydor Records albums